Micropterus henshalli, the Alabama bass, is a medium-sized freshwater ray finned fish, a black bass from the genus Micropterus which is part of the sunfish family Centrarchidae. This species is endemic to the southeastern United States where it is native to the rivers which drain into Mobile Bay in Florida, Alabama, Mississippi and Georgia where they are found in pools in rivers which have a good flow and in impoundments. They have been introduced elsewhere in the United States and the hybridisation of this species with the redeye bass after Alabama bass were introduced into Keowee Reservoir, South Carolina is thought to have probably been the cause in the decline in the population of redeye bass. Micropterus henshalli was first formally described as a subspecies of the spotted bass (M. punctulatus) by Carl Leavitt Hubbs and Reeve Maclaren Bailey in 1940 with the type locality given as Jefferson County, Alabama. The specific name honors James L. Henshall who was a bass angler.

References 

Micropterus henshalli Hubbs & Bailey, 1940 FishBase
Page, L.M. and B.M. Burr, 2011. A field guide to freshwater fishes of North America north of Mexico. Boston : Houghton Mifflin Harcourt, 663p.

Freshwater fish of North America